The 2021–22 season is Cambridge United's 110th year in their history, and first season back in the third tier since the 2001–02 season, following promotion last season. Along with the league, the club will also compete in the FA Cup, the EFL Cup and the EFL Trophy. The season covers the period from 1 July 2021 to 30 June 2022.

Pre-season
Cambridge United announced they would have friendlies against Cardiff City, Newmarket Town, Brentford XI, Queens Park Rangers, AFC Sudbury and Northampton Town as part of their pre-season preparations.

Competitions

League One

League table

Results summary

Results by matchday

Matches
The U's fixtures were revealed on 24 June 2021.

FA Cup

Cambridge were drawn away to Northampton Town in the first round, at home to Exeter City in the second round and away to Newcastle United in the third round.

EFL Cup

Cambridge United were drawn at home to Swindon Town in the first round and away to Millwall in the second round.

EFL Trophy

The U's were drawn into Southern Group H alongside Oxford United, Stevenage and Tottenham Hotspur U21s. On July 7, the fixtures for the group stage was announced. In the knock-out stages, Cambridge were drawn at home to Portsmouth and away to Rotherham United in the quarter-finals.

Transfers

Transfers in

Transfers out

Loans in

Loans out

References

Cambridge United
Cambridge United F.C. seasons